Coronel Fabriciano is a municipality in the state of Minas Gerais in the Southeast region of Brazil. It is located in the region of Vale do Rio Doce and is situated 200 km from the state capital. The municipal population was estimated in 2020 by IBGE in 110,290 inhabitants.

The municipality was emancipated from Antônio Dias in 1948 and its name is a tribute to Lieutenant colonel Fabriciano Felisberto Carvalho de Brito. The town was situated in the Vale do Aço (Steel Valley) metropolitan area, between the largest steel industries of Minas Gerais state; Usiminas, in Ipatinga, and the Aperam South America, in Timóteo. These industries were situated in Fabriciano at they time they were constructed, and were essential to the development of the city.  However, these facilities are located within the area of Ipatinga and Timóteo respectively, which were emancipated from Coronel Fabricano, and incorporated proper in 1964.

Coronel Fabriciano is located in the Serra dos Cocais, home of many natural attractions of the city like the "Pedra Dois Irmãos" (Two Brothers stone), the "Pedra do Caladão" (Silent stone), the "Cachoeira do Escorregador" (slide waterfalls), the "Trilhas da Mamucha" (Mamucha trails), and other waterfalls and trails.  Outdoor sports are popular such as hiking, trekking, mountain biking, parachute jumping, and 4x4 offroading. The city also features historical monuments like the "Catedral de São Sebastião" (Saint Sebastian Cathedral), the "Colégio Angélica" (Angélica College) and the "Monumento Terra Mãe" (motherland monument).

The Human Development Index (HDI) is 0.755, classified as high by the United Nations Development Programme (UNDP).

History

With the inauguration of the Calado Station, they began to be lifted up the first homes, very poor and basic. Only in 1928 was built, with the exception of the train station, the first house covered with ceramic and floored.

By the Law State no. 843, of November 17 of 1926, the district was created, settling the May 7 of 1927 in the then patrimony of Santo Antônio, that passed to Melo Viana to be called, having been named his/her first peace judge the citizen Manoel Camilo of Fonseca, that gave ownership to his/her first peace clerk, Mr. João the Baptist Pereira. The first registrations civil facts were: the twins' baptism Duraci of Distaneta, daughters of the couple Antônio Viana and the marriage of the Sírio Maron Abibi with Geralda Honrata of Souza. On March 1 of 1930, it was accomplished in the new district the first election

The first name of the place when virgin forest, was Barra, for finding located in the confluence of the ribeirão Caladão, starting to denominate Calado (Quiet), with the inauguration of the Rail Station. Almost time, Raul Soares was denominated, returning the Calado (Quiet) name again. In August 1938, it was baptized with Coronel Fabriciano Fabriciano name, in honor to colonel Fabriciano Felisberto of I Break, for occasion of his/her centennial from birth. Ten years later, the municipal district was created being dismembered of Antônio Dias.

On December 27 of 1948, after a long process gone through the procedure in the Legislative Assembly of the State, governor Milton Campos signs the Law no. 336, creating the municipal district of Coronel Fabriciano. The official installation felt in the day January 1 of 1949, in session presided by the peace judge José Anastácio Franco. It assumed as manager Dr. Antônio Gonçalves Gravatá, with the different objective of to organize the municipal administration and to give him/it to the official mayor, elect for the population. It is like this, the March 15 of 1949, they take ownership then the mayor Dr. Rubem Siqueira Maia, vice-mayor Colonel Silvino Pereira, aldermen Nicanor Ataíde, Lauro Pereira, Ary Barros, José Anatólio Barbosa, Wenceslau Martins Araújo, Sebastião Mendes Araújo, José Paula Viana, Raimundo Martins Fraga and José Wilson Camargo.

In spite of the emancipation and December 27 of 1948, an agreement was signed with the local parish, in which the birthday of the city is commemorated on January 20, day of the patron of the city, São Sebastião.

Geography

Statistics
Elevation: 240 m
Climate: Sub-tropical
Average annual temperature: 22 °C
Latitude South 19°31'07"
Longitude West: 42°37'44

Subdivisions

Main streets and avenues
Most of the city's main avenues (Avenidas) and streets (Ruas) are named after important people. Some of them are in blue below, linked to their Wikipedia article.
 Avenida Julita Pires Bretas
 Avenida José de Magalhães Pinto
 Avenida Geraldo Inácio
 Avenida Tancredo de Almeida Neves
 Avenida Rubens Siqueira Maia
 Rua Maria Matos
 Rua Pedro Nolasco
 Rua Moacir Birro
 Rua Marechal Floriano
 Rua São Sebastião
 Rua Argemiro José Ribeiro
 Rua Padre Américo Magalhães

Districts
 Senador Melo Viana
 Coronel Fabriciano (sede)

Neighborhoods

Distances from other cities (KM)
Belo Horizonte: 198
Rio de Janeiro: 560
São Paulo: 765
Vitória: 420
Brasília: 936
Ipatinga: 13
Timóteo: 6
Governador Valadares: 118
Sete Lagoas: 273

Economy

The city is between Ipatinga and Timóteo, that base the largest and more modern siderurgic industries of Minas Gerais: Usiminas and Arcelor Mittal Timóteo, respectively. Coronel Fabriciano, those cities and several others, are in the Metropolitan Area of Vale do Aço, where Fabriciano is the second largest city, and has the third GDP.

Trading, services, eucalyptus monoculture, small and medium industries are the main activities in Coronel Fabriciano.

Commercial
According to official statistics of the city hall (http://www.fabriciano.mg.gov.br), the commercial activities include 3.561 registered establishments, of the most varied branches. The section of services involves 3.275 names registered, with prominence for the branch of Hostelry: there are about 1.800 accommodations, and 400 of them are framed in the categories "three" or "four stars."

Agriculture
Eucalyptus, from rural areas, is used by Cenibra, a Brazilian-Japanese cellulose factory in Belo Oriente. It is also used by local charcoal factories.

Industry
Several factories are based in the city, many of then in the Industrial District.

Sports

Extreme
The mountains of Serra dos Cocais in Fabriciano is usually used for extreme sports. Motorcycles and bikes are often used. But it's also common to make slow rides by foot or by horse in these calm mountains and see the waterfalls.

Auto racing
The city's Jeep Club, Jipe Clube Vale do Aço, often organize jeep travels and competitions. In 2008, Fabriciano hosted the 3rd race of the state's 4x4 Regularity rally Championiship.

Football
The city main professional football club is Social that plays the state's first division

Images

See also
List of municipalities in Minas Gerais
Rubem Siqueira Maia
Saint Sebastian Cathedral
Saint Sebastian Parish

References

External links

Fabriciano.mg.gov.br
IBGE.gov.br

 
1949 establishments in Brazil
Populated places established in 1949
Municipalities in Minas Gerais